Kadandale is a village in Dakshina Kannada district of Karnataka state, India.  Kadandale has one of the oldest and a really magnificent Subramanya Temple. It was known to be one of the richest temples around. The income from this temple was supposedly enough to sustain several other temples around. The annual festivities of many temples around used to be conducted through this temple. The managing trustees of this temple are the Kadandale Guthu family. Agriculture is one of the main sources of livelihood for the people of this area. The village is native place of Kadandale Krishna Bhat of Hotel Woodlands fame. It is also the native place of Sri Sri Sri Esha Vittaldas Swamiji of Kemar Sandipani Ashram. In 1997, Kadandale witnessed an agitation led by K Jayaram Shetty Kadandale, against an illegal pigment factory manufacturing colours, which was planned to be set up in Kadandale, by forming Shambhavi River Environment Protection Committee.Succumbing to this pressure, Engelhard Highland Pvt. Ltd, the promoters of the pigment factory closed shop and left.

Geography 
According to Census 2011 information the location code or village code of Kadandale village is 574227. Kadandale village is located in Mangalore Tehsil of Dakshina Kannada district in Karnataka, India. It is situated 49 km away from Mangalore, which is both district & sub-district headquarter of Kadandale village. As per 2009 stats, Palladka is the gram panchayat of Kadandale village. The total geographical area of village is 1466.01 hectares. Kadandale has a total population of 3,760 peoples. There are about 850 houses in Kadandale village. Mudbidri is nearest town to Kadandale which is approximately 15 km away.  Population

Villages in Dakshina Kannada district